Renan Augustinho Marques (born 8 March 1983) is a Brazilian football player.

External links
Brazilian FA Database  

1983 births
Living people
Brazilian footballers
Association football forwards
América Futebol Clube (RN) players
Botafogo Futebol Clube (SP) players
Czech First League players
SK Dynamo České Budějovice players
Baniyas Club players
Paulista Futebol Clube players
Expatriate footballers in China
Expatriate footballers in Portugal
Brazilian expatriate sportspeople in China
Expatriate footballers in the Czech Republic
Brazilian expatriate sportspeople in the Czech Republic
Expatriate footballers in the United Arab Emirates
Brazilian expatriate sportspeople in the United Arab Emirates
Jeju United FC players
Shenzhen F.C. players
Chinese Super League players
China League One players
K League 1 players
Renan Marques
Renan Marques
UAE Pro League players
Expatriate footballers in South Korea
Brazilian expatriate sportspeople in South Korea
Expatriate footballers in Thailand
Brazilian expatriates in Thailand
People from Fernandópolis
Footballers from São Paulo (state)